Fairchild Wheeler Interdistrict Multi-Magnet High School is a magnet high school located in Bridgeport, Connecticut. It has an enrollment of approximately 1500 students in grades 9 through 12.

70% of students live in Bridgeport, and 30% of students live in the following districts: Easton, Fairfield, Milford, Monroe, Shelton, Stratford and Trumbull.

History 
The high school cost $125.8 million to build, making it the most expensive school in the state of Connecticut at the time. Since it is a magnet school, the state taxpayers paid $119 million of the costs. The school was built on both Trumbull and Bridgeport's land, but the campus was later given to Bridgeport.

The first 203 Fairchild Wheeler graduates graduated in 2016.

Multi-Magnet 
Fairchild Wheeler is made up of 3 smaller high schools with their own field of study.

Biotechnology Research & Zoological Research 

Interim Principal: Mr. Beswick Channer

Aerospace / Hydrospace Engineering & Physical Sciences 

Principal: Mr. Jay Lipp

Information Technology & Software Engineering 

Interim Principal: Mr. Christopher Johnson

References

Schools in Fairfield County, Connecticut
Public high schools in Connecticut